The inferior gluteal artery (sciatic artery) is the smaller of the two terminal branches of the anterior trunk of the internal iliac artery. It exits the pelvis through the greater sciatic foramen. It is distributed chiefly to the buttock and the back of the thigh.

Anatomy

Course 
It passes down on the sacral plexus of nerves and the piriformis muscle, behind the internal pudendal artery. It passes through the lower part of the greater sciatic foramen. It exits the pelvis between piriformis muscle and coccygeus muscle.

It then descends in the interval between the greater trochanter of the femur and tuberosity of the ischium. It is accompanied by the sciatic nerve and the posterior femoral cutaneous nerves, and covered by the gluteus maximus. It continues down the back of the thigh, supplying the skin, and anastomosing with branches of the perforating arteries.

Additional images

See also
 Superior gluteal artery

References

External links
 
  - "Sagittal view of the internal iliac artery and its branches in the female pelvis. "
 

Arteries of the abdomen